Elisabetta Ripani (born 30 March 1986) is an Italian politician who served as a Deputy from 23 March 2018 to 13 October 2022.

References

1986 births
21st-century Italian women politicians
Politicians from Grosseto
Forza Italia (2013) politicians
Deputies of Legislature XVIII of Italy
Living people
Women members of the Chamber of Deputies (Italy)